Masjid Temenggong Daeng Ibrahim (Jawi: مسجد تماڠڬوڠ دايڠ إبراهيم; Malay for Temenggong Daeng Ibrahim Mosque) also known as Masjid Diraja Teluk Blangah (Teluk Blangah Royal Mosque), is a historical royal mosque located along 30 Telok Blangah Road in Singapore. Near the mosque is the Johor Royal Mausoleum and Tanah Kubor Temenggong Johor, a small unkempt cemetery all co-located on site. The grounds of the mosque, mausoleum and cemetery are owned by the State of Johor for the Sultan of Johor. It is one of two mosques in the country not under purview by Majlis Ugama Islam Singapura but come under management of the Johor Religious Department.

History
In 1824, the grounds originally served as a residence of Temenggong Abdul Rahman known as Istana Lama, where he died there one year later and was buried at the nearby burial grounds that would later become a cemetery for his descendants known as Makam Diraja Teluk Blangah (Malay for Teluk Blangah Royal Mausoleum).

A building known as the Audience Hall with a pentagonal shaped roof was built next to this burial grounds at the unknown year to cater to his growing influence.

Upon the demise of his second son Temenggong Daeng Ibrahim in 1862, the Temenggong Daeng Ibrahim's succeeding first son Temenggong Abu Bakar moved his residence to Tyersall and the palace was later demolished by 1954.

Sometime later in 1871, the Audience Hall was converted into mosque. During this time, the mosque as it was originally known was named Masjid Kampong Telok Blangah.

In 1991, the original mosque was demolished. Following the pentagonal footprints of the former building, construction of the new mosque was completed in 1993 at a cost of RM 2.5 million. It was financed by the Sultan of Johor. To showcase its rich history, the mosque was named Masjid Temenggong Daeng Ibrahim.

See also
 Makam Diraja Teluk Blangah

References

External links
Masjid Temenggong Daeng Ibrahim at MUIS Mosque Directory
 GoogleMaps StreetView of Masjid Temenggong Daeng Ibrahim
GoogleMaps PhotoSphere of mosque interior.

Diraja Teluk Blangah
Malaysian diaspora in Singapore
Mosques completed in 1993
20th-century architecture in Singapore